Fusion engine may refer to:

 Fusion engine, an engine that runs on fusion power, generally referring to a fusion rocket.
 Fusion Engine, the game engine used in Descent 3